Carnation is a city in King County, Washington, United States. The population was 2,158 at the 2020 census. It was historically known as Tolt  and lies at the confluence of the Snoqualmie and Tolt rivers. The city is located east of Redmond and south of Duvall on State Route 203.

History
The Snoqualmie Valley was settled by white Americans in the 1850s and 1860s following the relocation of the Snoqualmie tribe to reservations. The community of Tolt, an Anglicized name for the Tolthue River ( or ), was founded in 1865 and platted in 1902. Tolt was incorporated as a town on December 30, 1912, shortly after the arrival of the Milwaukee Road, which provided train connections to Monroe in the north.

The valley was home to several dairy farms established in the 1900s, including a research farm for the Carnation Evaporated Milk Company. Following lobbying from the company and the approval of the state legislature, Tolt was renamed to "Carnation" in 1917. The renaming of the town was opposed by local residents and members of the Snoqualmie tribe, and later changed back to Tolt on May 3, 1928. The "Carnation" name remained on the post office and train depot, and continued to be used by outsiders. Tolt was then renamed back to "Carnation" on October 29, 1951. During the late 20th century, Carnation moved away from dairy farming and became a community for job centers in the Eastside, growing to a population of 2,158 by 2020.

Geography
Carnation lies in the Snoqualmie Valley between Duvall and Fall City. It is on the east bank of the Snoqualmie River just north of its junction with the Tolt River.

Climate
Carnation has a oceanic climate (Köppen Cfb).

Attractions
Founded in the early 1980s, Camlann is devoted to teaching and entertaining schools, clubs, families, and individuals about what life in England in 1376 would have been like.

Remlinger Farms is a functioning farm located less than  outside of the town center where families can spend time around crops, eat locally raised and grown food, and go on fun park rides.

Demographics

2010 census
At the census of 2010, there were 1,786 people in 631 households, including 474 families, in the city. The racial makeup of the city was 85.8% White, 0.9% African American, 1.0% Native American, 3.1% Asian, 0.1% Pacific Islander, 7.1% from other races, and 2.1% from two or more races. Hispanic or Latino of any race were 12.7%.

Of the 631 households, 45.0% had children under the age of 18 living with them, 58.5% were married couples living together, 10.0% had a female householder with no husband present, 6.7% had a male householder with no wife present, and 24.9% were non-families. 19.0% of households were one person, and 6.9% were one person aged 65 or older. The average household size was 2.83 and the average family size was 3.24.

The median age was 34.9 years. 30.1% of residents were under the age of 18; 6.8% were between the ages of 18 and 24; 29.4% were from 25 to 44; 27.7% were from 45 to 64; and 6% were 65 or older. The gender makeup of the city was 49.8% male and 50.2% female.

Carnation has a high rate of home ownership for King County; 73.31% of the homes in Carnation are occupied by people who own them.  This rate is considerably higher than nearby cities like Redmond (50.19%), Bellevue (53.78%), and Seattle (44.91%).

2000 census
At the census of 2000, there were 1,893 people in 636 households, including 487 families, in the city. The racial makeup of the city was 91.76% White, 1.32% Native American, 3.59% Asian, 0.16% Pacific Islander, 1.80% from other races, and 1.37% from two or more races. Hispanic or Latino of any race were 3.91% of the population.

Of the 636 households, 48.9% had children under the age of 18 living with them, 61.8% were married couples living together, 9.9% had a female householder with no husband present, and 23.4% were non-families. 17.5% of households were one person, and 7.2% were one person aged 65 or older. The average household size was 2.98 and the average family size was 3.40.

In the city the population was spread out, with 34.4% under the age of 18, 6.6% from 18 to 24, 37.5% from 25 to 44, 15.9% from 45 to 64, and 5.7% 65 or older. The median age was 32 years. For every 100 females, there were 98.6 males. For every 100 females age 18 and over, there were 96.5 males.

The median household income was $60,156 and the median family income  was $64,167. Males had a median income of $46,667 versus $33,281 for females. The per capita income for the city was $21,907. About 5.8% of families and 6.7% of the population were below the poverty line, including 7.5% of those under age 18 and 6.5% of those age 65 or over.

Schools
Carnation is in the Riverview School District, which consists of 4 traditional elementary schools and a homeschooling parent partnership program: Carnation Elementary and PARADE Program, Cherry Valley Elementary, Eagle Rock Multi-Age, and Stillwater Elementary, a single middle school: Tolt Middle School, and a single high school: Cedarcrest High School.

 Carnation Elementary and PARADE: Located in Carnation, Washington 32239 E. Morrison St.
 Cherry Valley Elementary: Located in Duvall, Washington
 Stillwater Elementary: Located between Carnation and Duvall
 Eagle Rock Multi-Age: Located in Duvall
 Tolt Middle School: Located in Carnation
 Cedarcrest High School: Located in Duvall

City landmarks
The City of Carnation has designated the following landmarks:

Government and police

Law enforcement services in Carnation has changed hands several times throughout its history. Until late 2004, the King County Sheriff's Office provided law enforcement services to the city on a contract basis. From late 2004 until January 1, 2014, the city contracted with the City of Duvall Police Department for law enforcement services. Effective January 1, 2014 the city is again contracting with the King County Sheriff's Office. The contract with the KCSO provides for one full-time dedicated officer to the city, when that officer is not working KCSO Deputies patrolling neighboring unincorporated areas will respond to calls in the city.

References

External links

 City of Carnation Home
 History of Carnation at HistoryLink
 Riverview School District
 Carnation-Duvall Citizen Corps Council

Cities in King County, Washington
1912 establishments in Washington (state)
Cities in the Seattle metropolitan area
Cities in Washington (state)
Populated places established in 1912